Grace Karunas is an Indian playback singer, actress who has worked in the Indian film industry. The wife of actor Karunas, Grace has often sung in films featuring her husband.

Career
Grace began singing at the age of five with the CSI Church, Poonamallee. She continued singing with her church and at college and caught the interest of actor Karunas during an intercollegiate competition, which the actor had come to judge. Karunas subsequently asked Grace to perform songs in his independent albums, and the pair later got married.

Her first film song was "Cheena Thaana Doi" in the Kamal Haasan-starrer Vasool Raja MBBS (2004), and she received the opportunity after Karunas had recommended her to the film's director Saran and music composer Bharadwaj. The success of the song made her popular and she soon worked on other songs including "Velaku Onnu Thiriya Paakudhu" from Devathaiyai Kanden (2004), "Alappuzha Ammani Allo" from Karka Kasadara (2005), "Freeya Vidu Maamu" in Aaru (2005), "Vaadi En Kappa Kezhange" in Sandai (2008) and "Aaada Varum Ulagathula" in Pandi (2008). In the 2010s, she has usually sung for films where Karunas has starred in the lead role. Along with her work in films, Grace has often performed as a live musician in stage shows.

Grace has also worked as an actress in films, notably appearing in Thiruvilaiyaadal Aarambam (2006) and Kathakali (2016) in supporting roles.

Personal life
Grace is married to actor and politician Karunas, whose films she has often worked on as a singer. Their son, Ken, has also appeared in films as an actor, after making his debut in Azhagu Kutti Chellam (2016). She participated as one of the cook in Cooku with Comali season 3 (Vijay Television).

Notable discography

Filmography
Thiruvilaiyaadal Aarambam (2006)
Kathakali (2016)

Television

References

External links

Living people
Indian women playback singers
Tamil playback singers
Singers from Chennai
Tamil singers
Women musicians from Tamil Nadu
21st-century Indian women singers
21st-century Indian singers
Year of birth missing (living people)